The Planning Directorate was the central body in the Israel Defense Forces' General Staff whose focus was on the strategic and tactical planning, the building of military forces, and military organization of the armed forces. It also served as a planning body for the Ministry of Defense, representing the IDF in various related fields to the Minister of Defense. It comprised the Planning Division, the Strategic Planning and tactical Relations Division, the Centre for Systems Analysis, and the Infrastructure and Organization Division. 

Ramatkal Dan Halutz reorganized the Directorate in 2006 to incorporate the old External Relations Directorate.

References

Military units and formations of Israel
Israel Defense Forces directorates